Medical Examination of Young Persons (Industry) Convention, 1946 is  an International Labour Organization Convention.

It was established in 1946 with the preamble stating:
Having decided upon the adoption of certain proposals with regard to medical examination for fitness for employment in industry of children and young persons,...

Ratifications
As of 2013, the convention has been ratified by 43 states.

External links 
Text.
Ratifications.

International Labour Organization conventions
Youth rights
Treaties concluded in 1946
Treaties entered into force in 1950
Treaties of the People's Socialist Republic of Albania
Treaties of Algeria
Treaties of Argentina
Treaties of Azerbaijan
Treaties of the Byelorussian Soviet Socialist Republic
Treaties of Belgium
Treaties of Bolivia
Treaties of the People's Republic of Bulgaria
Treaties of Cameroon
Treaties of the Comoros
Treaties of Cuba
Treaties of Czechoslovakia
Treaties of the Czech Republic
Treaties of Djibouti
Treaties of the Dominican Republic
Treaties of Ecuador
Treaties of El Salvador
Treaties of France
Treaties of the Kingdom of Greece
Treaties of Guatemala
Treaties of Haiti
Treaties of the Hungarian People's Republic
Treaties of the Kingdom of Iraq
Treaties of Israel
Treaties of Italy
Treaties of Kyrgyzstan
Treaties of Lebanon
Treaties of Luxembourg
Treaties of Malta
Treaties of Nicaragua
Treaties of Panama
Treaties of Paraguay
Treaties of Peru
Treaties of the Philippines
Treaties of the Polish People's Republic
Treaties of Portugal
Treaties of the Soviet Union
Treaties of Slovakia
Treaties of Francoist Spain
Treaties of Tajikistan
Treaties of Tunisia
Treaties of Turkey
Treaties of the Ukrainian Soviet Socialist Republic
Treaties of Uruguay
Occupational safety and health treaties
1946 in labor relations